Tottington may refer to:

Places
Tottington, Greater Manchester, a small town between Bury and Ramsbottom
 Tottington High School
 Tottington railway station, closed 1963
Tottington, Norfolk, a deserted village and civil parish
Great Tottington, a moated manor farm near Maidstone in the English county of Kent

People
 Alexander Tottington (before 1406–1413), Bishop of Norwich
 Samson of Tottington (1135-1211), English Benedictine monk from Tottington, Norfolk

See also